Fabio Wyss (born 9 June 1989) is a Swiss canoeist. He competed in the men's K-1 1000 metres event at the 2016 Summer Olympics.

References

External links
 
 

1989 births
Living people
Swiss male canoeists
Olympic canoeists of Switzerland
Canoeists at the 2016 Summer Olympics
Place of birth missing (living people)
Canoeists at the 2015 European Games
European Games competitors for Switzerland
21st-century Swiss people